The 2018 Swedish Golf Tour was the 35th season of the Swedish Golf Tour.

Most of tournaments also featured on the 2018 Nordic Golf League.

Schedule
The following table lists official events during the 2018 season.

Order of Merit
The Order of Merit was based on prize money won during the season, calculated using a points-based system.

See also
2018 Danish Golf Tour
2018 Swedish Golf Tour (women)

Notes

References

Swedish Golf Tour
Swedish Golf Tour